ANY was an architectural journal, published by the ANYone Corporation for over seven years. A total of 27 issues were published. The first issue was published in May 1993, and its last was published in September 2000. ANY was succeeded by Log, also published by the ANYone Corporation. 

Notable contributors to the magazine included Zaha Hadid, Bernard Tschumi, Elizabeth Diller, Rem Koolhaas, Sanford Kwinter, R.E. Somol, Peter Eisenman, and Greg Lynn. 

Issues one to eight were designed by longtime Eisenman collaborator, Massimo Vignelli. Beginning with number eight, the magazine was designed by graphic design firm, 2x4.

References

External links
 ANY Magazine
 
 Finding aid for the Anyone Corporation fonds, Canadian Centre for Architecture (digitized items)

Visual arts magazines published in the United States
Architecture magazines
Magazines established in 1993
Magazines disestablished in 2000
Defunct magazines published in the United States
Magazines published in New York City